Patania violacealis is a moth in the family Crambidae that is endemic in Réunion.
The wingspan of this moth is approx. 25mm.

It looks very similar to Herpetogramma licarsisalis, but under light the surface of its wings shines violet.

See also
 List of moths of Réunion

References

Moths described in 1996
Endemic fauna of Réunion
Spilomelinae
Moths of Réunion